Richard Anthony Fay (born 14 May 1974) is an English former cricketer. Fay was a right-handed batsman who bowled right-arm medium pace.  He was born in Kilburn, London.

Fay made his first-class debut for Middlesex against Yorkshire in the 1995 County Championship.  From 1995 to 1996, he represented the county in 16 first-class matches, the last of which came against Leicestershire.  In his 16 first-class, he scored 164 runs at a batting average of 7.45, with high score of 26.  In the field he took 5 catches.  With the ball he took 31 wickets at a bowling average of 36.96, with best figures of 4/53.

It was for Middlesex that he made his debut in List A cricket against Surrey in the 1995 AXA Equity and Law League.  From 1995 to 1997, he represented the county in 28 List A matches, the last of which came against Nottinghamshire in the 1997 AXA Life League.  In his 28 matches for the county, he took 29 wickets at a bowling average of 31.20, with best figures of 4/33.  Fay left Middlesex at the end of the 1997 season.

In 2000, he represented the Middlesex Cricket Board in 2 List A matches against Wiltshire and Sussex in the 2000 NatWest Trophy.

References

External links
Ricky Fay at Cricinfo
Ricky Fay at CricketArchive

1974 births
Living people
People from Kilburn, London
Cricketers from Greater London
English cricketers
Middlesex cricketers
Middlesex Cricket Board cricketers